Jon Nelson is a sound collage artist and a radio show host for Some Assembly Required.  He "mashes music and found sound — from old movies, laugh tracks, the news — to make what he calls the audio dreamscape of the media age."  Jon Nelson has been championing the genre of mashup music for more than 10 years; Some Assembly Required is now syndicated throughout the United States and Canada. 262 episodes were produced from 1999 to 2011.

Reviews and articles
The Art of Mashups By Tom Asbrook, On Point, February 5, 2009
Jon Nelson of Escape Mechanism 23007 by Katya Tylevich A.V. Club Twin Cities, January 28, 2009
 Some Assembly Required: Mash-Up Pioneer Dreams in Soundbites By Elizabeth Held, Wired Magazine, December 22, 2008
Escape Mechanism promotes recycling! by Max Ross, Secrets of the City, September 16, 2008
Click, shriek, boom! Sonic collage artist Escape Mechanism cuts and pastes while aural trickster Lost in Translation slashes and burns by Michaelangelo MatosCity Pages (Volume 20 - Issue 949 - February 10, 1999)

Discography
Escape Mechanism (Emphasis Added) (2008)
Cast of Thousands with Escape Mechanism Self Titled (2004)
Escape Mechanism, Steev Hise, The Tape-beatles, Wobbly Minneapolis Summit (2002)
Escape Mechanism Self Titled (1998)

References

External links
Some Assembly Required website
Escape Mechanism website
Post Consumer Productions website

American male classical composers
American classical composers
20th-century classical composers
21st-century classical composers
Living people
21st-century American composers
20th-century American composers
20th-century American male musicians
21st-century American male musicians
Year of birth missing (living people)